Antictenia punctunculus is a species of moth of the family Geometridae first described by Thomas Pennington Lucas in 1892. It is found in Australia.

References

Oenochrominae
Moths of Australia
Moths described in 1892